The Journal of Indian Association for Child and Adolescent Mental Health is a quarterly peer-reviewed medical journal covering child psychiatry. It is published by the Indian Association for Child and Adolescent Mental Health and edited by Naresh Nebhinani. The journal is abstracted and indexed in CINAHL, EMBASE, and Scopus.

External links 
 

Psychiatry journals
English-language journals
Academic journals published by learned and professional societies of India
Quarterly journals
Publications established in 2005